Sir Alexander Mackenzie was a Scottish composer, conductor and teacher.  As a composer, he is best known for his oratorios, violin and piano pieces, Scottish folk music and works for the stage.  He had many successes as a composer, producing over 90 compositions.  Some of his early compositions were performed as a student at the Royal Academy of Music.

He composed the following works:

Orchestral works
 1862 - Festmarsch
 1864 - Concert Overture
 1869 - Overture to a Comedy
 1876 - Cervantes, overture (fp. Sondershausen, 2 September 1877)
 1878 - Scherzo (fp. Crystal Palace, London, 18 October 1878)
 1879 - Rhapsodie Ecossaise, Op.21 (fp. Edinburgh Choral Union, 5 January 1880)
 1880 - Burns [Second Scottish Rhapsody], Op.24 (fp. Glasgow, January 1881)
 1880 - Tempo di Ballo, overture
 1883 - La belle dame sans merci, tone poem, Op.29 (fp. Philharmonic Society, London, 9 May 1883)
 1888 - Benedictus, for orchestra, Op.37 No.3
 1888 - Twelfth Night, overture, Op.40 (fp. St James's Hall, London, 4 June 1888)
 1894 - Britannia, nautical overture, Op.52 (fp. Royal Academy of Music, London, 17 May 1894)
 1894 - From the North: Three Scottish Pieces for Orchestra, Op.53 (fp. Philharmonic Society, London, 3 April 1895)
 1902 - Coronation March, Op.63 (fp. Alhambra Theatre, London, 13 May 1902)
 1902 - London Day by Day, suite, Op.64 (fp. Norwich Festival, 22 October 1902)
 1904 - Canadian Rhapsody, Op.67 (fp. Philharmonic Society, London, 15 March 1905)
 1910 - La Savannah, air de ballet, Op.72 (fp. Bournemouth, 6 April 1911)
 1911 - Tam o’Shanter [Third Scottish Rhapsody], Op.74 (fp. Queen's Hall, London, 20 May 1911)
 1911 - An English Joy-Peal, Op.75 (fp. Westminster Abbey, London, 22 June 1911)
 1911 - Invocation, Op.76 (fp. Philharmonic Society, London, 21 March 1912)
 1915 - Ancient Scots Tunes, Op.82 (fp. Queen's Hall, London, 31 August 1916)
 1922 - Youth, Sport, Loyalty, overture, Op.90 (fp. Royal Academy of Music, London, 20 July 1922)

Concertante works
 1875 - Larghetto and Allegretto, for cello and orchestra, Op.10
 1884-85 - Violin Concerto in C# minor, Op.32 (fp. Birmingham Festival, 26 August 1885)
 1889 - Pibroch, suite for violin and orchestra, Op.42 (fp. Leeds Festival, 10 October 1889)
 1891 - Highland Ballad, for violin and orchestra, Op.47 No.1 (fp. St James's Hall, London, 17 May 1893)
 1897 - Scottish Concerto, for piano and orchestra, Op.55 (fp. Philharmonic Society, London, 24 March 1897)
 1906-07 - Suite, for violin and orchestra, Op.68 (fp. Queen's Hall, London, 18 February 1907)

Choral works
 1881 - The Bride, cantata, Op.25 (fp. Worcester Festival, 6 September 1881)
 1882 - Jason, cantata, Op.26 (fp. Bristol Festival, 19 October 1882)
 1884 - The Rose of Sharon, dramatic oratorio, Op.30 (fp. Norwich Festival, 16 October 1884)
 1886 - The Story of Sayid, cantata, Op.34 (fp. Leeds Festival, 13 October 1886)
 1887 - A Jubilee Ode, for soli, chorus and orchestra, Op.36 (fp. Crystal Palace, London, 22 June 1887)
 1887 - The New Covenant, ode for chorus, military band and organ, Op.38 (fp. Glasgow International Festival, 8 May 1888)
 1888-89 - The Dream of Jubal, poem with music, Op.41 (fp. Liverpool Philharmonic Society, 5 February 1889)
 1889 - The Cotter’s Saturday Night, cantata, Op.39 (fp. Edinburgh Choral Union, 16 December 1889)
 1891 - Veni Creator Spiritus, cantata, Op.46 (fp. Birmingham Festival, 6 October 1891)
 1892 - Bethlehem, mystery [oratorio], Op.49 (fp. Royal Albert Hall, London, 12 April 1894)
 1904 - The Witch’s Daughter, cantata, Op.66 (fp. Leeds Festival, 5 October 1904)
 1908 - The Sun-God’s Return, cantata, Op.69 (fp. Cardiff Festival, 21 September 1910)

Operatic works

 1882-83 - Colomba, lyrical drama, Op.28 (fp. Drury Lane Theatre, London, 9 April 1883)
 1886 - The Troubadour, lyrical drama, Op.33 (fp. Drury Lane Theatre, London, 8 June 1886)
 1897 - His Majesty; or, The Court of Vingolia, comic opera (fp. Savoy Theatre, London, 20 February 1897) [full score lost]
 1901 - The Cricket on the Hearth, Op.62 (fp. Royal Academy of Music, London, 6 June 1914)
 1904-05 - The Knights of the Road, operetta, Op.65 (fp. Palace Theatre, London, 27 February 1905) [full score lost]
 1916-20 - The Eve of St John, Op.87 (fp. British National Opera Company, Liverpool, 16 April 1924)

Incidental music
 1890 - Ravenswood, Op.45 (fp. Lyceum Theatre, London, September 1890) [full score lost]
 1891 - Marmion, Op.43 (fp. Theatre Royal, Glasgow, April 1891)
 1897 - The Little Minister, Op.57 (fp. Haymarket Theatre, London, 6 November 1897)
 1898 - Manfred, Op.58 (written for the Lyceum Theatre, London, but the production was cancelled)
 1901 - Coriolanus, Op.61 (fp. Lyceum Theatre, London, 15 April 1901)

Musical recitation
 1890 Ellen McJones, recitation with piano
 1895 - Eugene Aram, recitation with orchestra, Op.59 No.2 (fp. Queen's Hall, London, 2 October 1895) [full score lost]
 1911 - Dickens in Camp, recitation with piano

Chamber
 1867 - Piano Trio in Bb
 1868 - String Quartet in G
 1873 - Piano Quartet in Eb, Op. 11
 1882 - Three pieces for organ, Op.27
 1888 - Six pieces for violin and piano, Op.37
 1895 - From the North, nine pieces for violin and piano, Op.53
 1905 - Larghetto religioso for violin and piano
 1913 - Invocation for violin and piano, Op.76
 1915 - Four Dance Measures for violin and piano, Op.80
 1920 - In Memoriam, postlude for organ and violin
 1922 - Distant Chimes for violin and piano, Op.89
 1924 - Gipsy Dance for violin and piano
 1928 - Two pieces for violin and piano, Op.91

Piano solo
 1861 - Nocturne
 1861 - Variations in E minor
 1862 - Sehnsucht
 1862 - Ungarisch
 1876 - Rustic Scenes, Op.9
 1877 - Five Pieces, Op.13
 1877 - Trois Morceaux, Op.15
 1879 - Six Compositions, Op.20
 1880 - Scenes in the Scottish Highlands (three pieces), Op.23
 1885? - Six Song Transcriptions by Giuseppe Buonamici 
 1899 - Morris Dance
 1909 - Fantasia in Eb, Op.70
 1915 - English Air with Variations, Op.81
 1916 - Jottings – 6 Cheerful Little Pieces (Books 1 and 2)
 1916 - Odds and Ends (four pieces), Op.83
 1921 - Varying Moods (four pieces)

References

External links
Discussion of violin pieces
Discussion of piano pieces

 
Mackenzie
Works by Scottish people